An Yang (born July 23, 1984, in Harbin) is a Chinese pair skater. He competes with Zhao Rui. They are the 2006 Chinese national champions.

External links
 

1984 births
Living people
Chinese male pair skaters
Figure skaters from Harbin